Deuljwi (들쥐, Field Mouse) is a 1927 Korean film written, directed, edited by and starring Na Woon-gyu (1902-1937). It premiered at the Danseongsa Theater in Seoul.

Plot
The plot concerns a young couple who have made a marriage vow with each other. Their marriage is thwarted when the woman is forced to marry a rich gangster. A fighter for justice called "Deuljwi(Field Mouse)" stops the wedding, kills the gangsters, and returns the bride to her betrothed.

Reception
The film was considered to be work of art that symbollically represent the invasiveness of Japanese colonialists with the rich gangster being the Japanese and the man who was stolen of his potential wife being the korean nation and was banned by the Japanese authorities on the very next day of release. The film was the first one to be banned and was able to be screened after cuts.

See also
 List of Korean-language films
 Cinema of Korea

References

External links
 

1927 films
Pre-1948 Korean films
Korean silent films
Korean black-and-white films
Korean-language films
Films directed by Na Woon-gyu